Nadhi is a 2022 Indian Tamil-language romantic drama film directed by K. Thamaraiselvan. The film stars Sam Jones, Anandhi and Karu Pazhaniappan in the lead roles. It was released on 22 July 2022.

Cast
Sam Jones as Thamizh
Anandhi as Bharathi
Karu Pazhaniappan
Munishkanth as Manikkam
Vela Ramamoorthy
Surekha Vani

Production
For his role in the film, Sam Jones lost 13 kilograms and learnt Madurai slang. Karu Pazhaniappan, who had been attempting to make a breakthrough as an actor in lead roles, opted to work as the film's antagonist after being impressed with the script.

The film was shot in regions including Madurai and Munnar.

Music 

The film's soundtrack was composed by Dhibu Ninan Thomas. while lyrics are written by Thamarai.

Reception
The film was released on 22 July 2022 across Tamil Nadu. The critic from Times of India noted that it was "an anti-caste love story that could have been more powerful", adding "Nadhi flows seamlessly in the first half, quenching all our thirst. But as the film progresses, it loses its track leaving the audience drained out".

A critic from Dina Malar gave the film a middling review, rating it 2 out of 5 stars. Likewise, a critic from The Hindu also gave the film an average review.

References

External links

2022 films
2022 drama films
Indian drama films
2020s Tamil-language films